This is a timeline of the 2008 Mumbai attacks.

Warnings given to Taj Hotel and the Centre 

In October, US intelligence agencies warned the chairman of the company that owns the hotel, Mr Ratan Tata that there will be a terrorist attack on the Taj Mahal Palace Hotel. Security was increased, but was removed soon after.

On 18 November, Indian intelligence agencies intercepted a satellite phone call to a leader of Lashkar-e-Taiba terrorist organization, which revealed plans for a sea borne attack.

Entry into India and initial attacks

At the Taj Mahal Palace and Tower Hotel
Sources: NDTV, Evening Standard, and BBC

At the Oberoi Trident

At Nariman House

See also

References

External links
  Channel 4 documentary by Dan Reed, with detailed account of the attack

2008 Mumbai attacks